Joel Orozmán Burgueño Marcant (born 14 February 1988) is an Uruguayan footballer who plays for Albion FC.

References
 
 
 

1988 births
Living people
Uruguayan footballers
Uruguayan expatriate footballers
Rocha F.C. players
Villa Teresa players
C.A. Rentistas players
Sportivo Cerrito players
El Tanque Sisley players
Cerro Largo F.C. players
Club Libertad footballers
C.D. Antofagasta footballers
Racing Club de Montevideo players
C.A. Progreso players
Uruguayan Primera División players
Uruguayan Segunda División players
Chilean Primera División players
Paraguayan Primera División players
Association football forwards
Uruguayan expatriate sportspeople in Chile
Uruguayan expatriate sportspeople in Paraguay
Expatriate footballers in Chile
Expatriate footballers in Paraguay